Brandlive is a Software as a service (SaaS) company based in Portland, Oregon, USA.

Products 
The Streams platform is used for virtual events with a high volume of guests and is designed as a creative canvas for the video content being streamed. The software allows people to create branded virtual and hybrid meetings and event pages, and add features like chat, downloads, product links, and social integrations.

The Showrooms platform is software brands use to launch products and do other training and content-driven experiences in a private environment. It includes features such as “product catalog”, an agenda customized to each event participant, and moderated Q&A and chat. 

Greenroom is a cloud-based video production tool that streams to any of Brandlive's Audience Platforms (Events, Showrooms, or Allhands) or any other streaming destination. Features include media uploads to share slides or pre-recorded video, producer “in ear” comms, drag and drop segments, and lower third titles for presenters.

Allhands is for all-company, town hall style corporate meetings for companies of all sizes. The virtual “allhands” destination is designed with company branding and features including: between-meeting Q&A, agenda, chat, video question submissions, and upvoting certain employee questions.

History 

2010 — 2019

Brandlive was founded in 2010 by Ben McKinley and Fritz Brumder as a product of Cascade Web Development, as a way to incorporate live video into online shopping. The idea for Brandlive came to Brumder when he was using Skype to see a friend's new retail store in New York City, and made a purchase as a result of the demonstration via live video.

In 2012, Brandlive was established as its own separate entity. 

In May 2013, the company received $1.6 million in Series A funding from Oregon Angel Fund, Angel Oregon, Portland Seed Fund, among others.

In September 2013, Brandlive was announced as a finalist for the Oregon Entrepreneurs Network Tom Holce Entrepreneurship Awards.

In 2016, Stephen Marsh's Archivist Capital led Brandlive's $3.2 million funding round.

Brandlive closed 2017 with revenue of $1.9M, and 2018 with $3.1M, and was featured as one of the top ten fastest growing Portland, OR companies. 

In July 2018, CEO Fritz Brumder moved into the role of COO, and new CEO Jeff Allen took the reins.

2020 — Present

At the start of 2020, Archivist Capital finalized a transaction to buy most of the business and Sam Kolbert-Hyle, a partner at Archivist, stepped in as Brandlive's new CEO. After analyzing the usage of the platform, Kolbert-Hyle invested in a new direction of product development: to reinvent large, internal corporate allhands and townhall meetings. 

When quarantine set in towards the end of March 2020, customers started reaching out to Brandlive because they were having trouble playing premium video content through popular web meeting platforms. Many started asking for help producing elevated video meetings that looked more like TV for gatherings that were historically held in person. In response, Brandlive launched Greenroom in May 2020.

Starting in May 2020, Brandlive did 230 events for Biden Campaign for President team, securing more than $30 million in donations. The largest fundraising event featured President Barack Obama and raised over in $11 million with more than 470,000 views. Brandlive also did celebrity reunion fundraisers including the casts of The Princess Bride, Parks and Rec, The West Wing, and more.

In February 2021, the Showrooms platform was mentioned in a Vogue Business article about digital wholesale technology.

In March 2021, Fast Company named Brandlive as 2021's #1 Most Innovative Company in the Live Events category. Fast Company also named Brandlive on their “50 Most Innovative Companies of the Year” at #44 out of 400 global companies.

Also in March 2021, Forbes ran an article about the Allhands Platform, reporting, “Features like interactive quizzes, surveys and upvoting allow employees to interact in real time. And for those who aren’t able to tune in live, Allhands provides replays and highlight reels”

As of May 2021, Brandlive had 200 employees.

References

External links 
 

Software companies based in Oregon
Companies based in Portland, Oregon
2010 establishments in Oregon
As a service
Software companies of the United States
Software companies established in 2010
American companies established in 2010